Agia Paraskevi B.C. may refer to:
GS Agia Paraskevi, a Greek women's basketball club, founded in 1976, based in Agia Paraskevi
Basketball Agia Paraskevi, a Greek men's basketball club, founded in 1986, based in Agia Paraskevi